Kevin Anthony Leahy  (born 1946) is a British archaeologist and small finds specialist. He is the National Finds Adviser for early-medieval metalwork for the Portable Antiquities Scheme. He was elected as a Fellow of the Society of Antiquaries of London on 8 May 1987. Leahy was involved in the research and publication of the Staffordshire Hoard.

Select publications
Leahy, K. 2003. Anglo-Saxon crafts. Stroud, Tempus. 
Leahy, K. 2007. Interrupting the pots : the excavation of Cleatham Anglo-Saxon cemetery, North Lincolnshire. York, Council for British Archaeology.
Leahy, K. 2007. The Anglo-Saxon kingdom of Lindsey. Stroud, Tempus.
Leahy, K. and Bland, R. 2009. The Staffordshire hoard. London, British Museum.

References

External links
Kevin Leahy speaking at the press conference on the discovery of the Staffordshire Hoard

Living people
Year of birth missing (living people)
Place of birth missing (living people)
Fellows of the Society of Antiquaries of London
British archaeologists
20th-century archaeologists
21st-century archaeologists
People associated with the Portable Antiquities Scheme